Ben Scrien, is the highest point on the Outer Hebridean island of Eriskay.

Described as an apparently "uninspiring lump" (Michael Fitzpatrick, 2012) it nevertheless commands fine views of Barra, South Uist, Skye, Tiree and Coll. Between the months of may and November Beinn scrien is home to the islands sheep and the Eriskay ponies. The ascent time is between 0.5 and 1.5 hours.

References

Marilyns of Scotland
Mountains and hills of the Outer Hebrides